Zgornja Bačkova is a small settlement in the Municipality of Sveta Ana in the Slovene Hills in northeastern Slovenia.

References

External links
Zgornja Bačkova on Geopedia

Populated places in the Municipality of Sveta Ana